Storybook Land is a  family amusement park located in Egg Harbor Township, New Jersey, United States. The park is themed after many storybook characters such as Mother Goose, the Three Little Pigs, and many more.

Some of its most prominent attractions are the J&J Railroad Train (which loops around most of the park), the Happy Dragon, and Whirly-Bug the Ferris wheel. The Land of Make Believe (not to be confused with the amusement park of the same name in Hope Township, New Jersey) has many of the standard amusement park rides such as Bubbles the Coaster, a junior sized roller coaster, and the Turtle Twirl, a Tilt-A-Whirl.  Storybook Land also has a Santa Claus house where Santa and Mrs. Claus will pose with the children during the Christmas season.

Visiting the park
Storybook Land has several counter-service restaurants and a large, covered picnic area for bringing a meal from home. During the months of April and May, the park is heavily visited by school groups.

Rides 

 Whirly Bug
 Rock, Spin, & Roll
 Carousel
 Candy Cane Express
 Tick Tock Clock Drop
 Happy Dragon
 Out on a Limb
 Olde Tymers
 Beanstalk Bounce
 Tea Time
 Bubbles the Coaster
 Zip Zap Racers
 Turtle Twirl
 Rockin' Tug
 Deep Sea Divers
 J&J Railroad
 Work Zone
 Jumbos

References

External links

1955 establishments in New Jersey
Amusement parks in New Jersey
Buildings and structures in Atlantic County, New Jersey
Egg Harbor Township, New Jersey
U.S. Route 322
Tourist attractions in Atlantic County, New Jersey
Amusement parks opened in 1955